Indian clubs, which originated in the Indian subcontinent, are a type of exercise equipment used to present resistance in movement to develop strength and mobility. They consist of juggling club shaped wooden clubs of varying sizes and weights, which are swung in certain patterns as part of a strength exercise program. They can range in weight from a few pounds each to special clubs that can weigh as much as up to 100 pounds. They were used in carefully choreographed routines in which the clubs were swung in unison by a group of exercisers, led by an instructor,  similar to 21st-century aerobics or zumba classes. The routines would vary according to the group's ability along with the weights of the clubs being used. When the 19th-century British colonists came across exercising clubs in India, they named them Indian clubs.

History 

Club swinging is believed to have originated in India by soldiers as a method of improving strength, agility, balance and physical ability.

Gada club is a blunt mace from the Indian subcontinent. Made either of wood or metal, it consists essentially of a spherical head mounted on a shaft, with a spike on the top. The gada is one of the traditional pieces of training equipment in Hindu physical culture, and is common in the akhara of north India. Maces of various weights and heights are used depending on the strength and skill level of the practitioner. It is believed that Lord Hanuman's gada was the largest amongst all the gadas in the world. For training purposes, one or two wooden gada (mudgar) are swung behind the back in several different ways; this is particularly useful for building grip strength and shoulder endurance. Mudgar are mentioned in the Indian treatise Arthashastra written by Kautilya dated to the 4th century BC.

Tamilnadu, the southern state of India also has a similar culture and the clubs are known as Karalakattai. There are 64 different types of swings and exercises focusing on various muscles and parts of the body. This age old training equipment is believed to have been a common thing in almost every household of Tamilnadu about 2000 years ago. Practitioners of this equipment further believe that it dates back to a time when the continent Kumarikandam a.k.a. Lemuria existed.

Several mauryan era coins depict club swinging; the Gupta era gold coin also depicts one of its kings performing club swinging with Gada. Gandharan fifth century schist used as wrestler's weight with Gada carved on it indicates that Gada might have been used as a training tool. Manasollasa written in the twelfth century explicitly describes training exercises and club swinging along with wrestling. The thirteenth century text, Malla Purana, discusses Lord Krishna and Balarama's prescriptions regarding wrestlers’ bodies and training methods such as club swinging; the text exhibits that the club swinging has long been a regulated practice. A Rajput painting from 1610 AD shows athletes performing various acrobatics including club swinging while dancing on Raga Desahka. A Mughal painting from 1670 depicts Indian athletes using Indian clubs and performing other exercises such as weightlifting, mallakhamb. In the nineteenth century when the British adopted Indian clubs they were remodelled into lightweight clubs bearing little resemblance to their traditional counterparts. Whereas traditional clubs weighed up to seventy pounds, those recommended, and adopted by Britain's army, weighed four.

While torches and other stick-like objects have been used in juggling for centuries, the modern juggling club was inspired by Indian clubs, which were first repurposed for juggling by DeWitt Cook in the 1800s.

Exceptionally popular during the fitness movement of the late Victorian era, used by military cadets and well-heeled ladies alike, they  appeared as a gymnastic event in the 1904 and 1932 Olympics. Gymnasiums were built solely to cater to club exercise groups. During the late 19th and early 20th centuries they became increasingly common in Europe, the British Commonwealth and the United States.

Circa 1913/14 the Bodyguard unit of the British suffragette movement carried Indian clubs as concealed weapons for use against the truncheons of the police.

The popularity of Indian clubs waned in Europe during the 1920s and 1930s as organized sports became more prevalent. Regimented exercise routines, like those requiring Indian clubs, were relegated to professional athletes and the military, who had access to more effective and modern strength training equipment.

There are physical fitness enthusiasts reviving the usage of Indian Clubs in the early 21st century, citing the aerobic exercise and safety advantages over traditional free weight regimens. There are nostalgic replicas of the original clubs being manufactured, as well as modern engineering updates to the concept, such as the Clubbell.

Persian clubs 
Exercise clubs similar to indian clubs are also found in Persia, where they are referred to as meels or mils. The earliest records of this type of resistance device being used by wrestlers predates the 19th century, in ancient Persia, Egypt and the rest of the Middle East. Their  practice has continued to the present day, notably in the varzesh-e bastani tradition practiced in the zurkaneh of Iran.

Japanese version 
Chi'ishi, a karate conditioning equipment and its exercise pattern was inspired by the gada and mugdar. The war clubs were also inspired by gada.

Gallery

See also
Kettlebell
Newark Athlete
Toss juggling
Gymnastics at the 1904 Summer Olympics – Men's club swinging and Gymnastics at the 1932 Summer Olympics – Men's Indian clubs

References

External links

 Modern Club Swinging and Pole Spinning: Free Downloadable Book
Club Swinging Bibliography
 Documentary video of Iranian Club Swinging
 Exercises with Clubs, by Dio Lewis, M.D., 1862
Indian Club Exercises from Athletic Sports for Boys, by Dick and Fitzgerald, 1866
Dick's Indian-Club Exercises, 1887
Gymnastic Nomenclature for Apparatus and Indian Club Movements, 1949
 Indian clubs and dumb bells, by J H Dougherty, 1901

Former Summer Olympic sports
Juggling props
Twirling
Physical exercise
Weight training equipment